× Renanstylis, abbreviated  Rnst. in the horticultural trade, is the nothogenus for intergeneric hybrids between the orchid genera Renanthera and Rhynchostylis (Ren. x Rhy.).

References

Orchid nothogenera
Aeridinae